Theodore Isidore Gottlieb (November 11, 1906 – April 5, 2001), mostly known as Brother Theodore, was a German-born American actor and comedian known for rambling, stream-of-consciousness monologues which he called "stand-up tragedy".  He was described as "Boris Karloff, surrealist Salvador Dalí, Nijinsky and Red Skelton…simultaneously".

Biography

Early years
Gottlieb was born into a wealthy Jewish family in Düsseldorf, in the Rhine Province, where his father was a magazine publisher. He attended the University of Cologne. At age 32, under Nazi rule, he was imprisoned at the Dachau concentration camp until he signed over his family's fortune for one Reichsmark. After being deported from Switzerland for chess hustling, he went to Austria where Albert Einstein, a family friend, helped him immigrate to the United States.

In USA
He worked as a janitor at Stanford University, where he demonstrated his prowess at chess by beating 30 professors simultaneously, and later became a dockworker in San Francisco. He played a bit part in Orson Welles' 1946 movie The Stranger. This was one of the several movie appearances he made beginning in the 1940s and continuing into the 1990s. These were mostly small parts in B-movies, although he did provide the voice of Gollum in the 1977 made-for-television animated version of The Hobbit and the follow-up adaptation of The Return of the King (1980). He also voiced Ruhk, Mommy Fortuna's assistant and carnival barker in The Last Unicorn (1982).

Success
Theodore's career as a monologuist began in California in the late 1940s, with dramatic Poe recitals. He moved to New York City, and by the 1950s, his monologues, now darkly humorous, had attracted a cult following. In 1958, he presented a one-man show that promoted the idea that human beings should walk on all fours. Jay Landesman booked him at St. Louis' Crystal Palace during the 1960s. In the early 1960s, he frequently performed at the Café Bizarre in New York's Greenwich Village (106 W 3rd Street). He reached a wider audience through television, with 36 appearances on The Merv Griffin Show in the 1960s and '70s, and was also a guest on The Tonight Show Starring Johnny Carson, The Dick Cavett Show, and The Joey Bishop Show. After his nightclub and TV appearances in the 1950s and '60s waned, he retired in the mid-1970s.

Comeback
He was pulled out of retirement and booked by magician Dorothy Dietrich and Dick Brooks in the Magic Towne House on the affluent Upper East Side of Manhattan for special weekend midnight performances. Years earlier, Brooks had remembered seeing Brother Theodore drawing large crowds at small, eclectic clubs across the Lower East Side (Greenwich and the East Village) and sought him out to appear at his new club. This resulted in a resurgence of interest in Brother Theodore that brought him success in his later years starting with Tom Snyder's Tomorrow Show in 1977 followed by more TV appearances and movies. According to Brooks, it took multiple calls to Theodore to convince him to make a comeback.  Theodore's attitude was very bleak, and he felt his career was over.  Brooks wanted to charge ten or more dollars, but Theodore insisted on four dollars, so as not to scare people away.  The show was a success and ran for three years. A picture of the Magic Towne House ad appeared in local New York newspapers such as the Village Voice and The New York Post.

In an interview for MUM, The Society of American Magicians official magazine Dorothy Dietrich said:

Dick knew him. As a kid Dick used to see him around the village and they would be lined up around the block to see him. The stage was black with a pin spot on a desk which was raked towards the audience. The light comes on and there he is with a big shadow behind him. He just stares at the audience for an excruciatingly long time. Then he says, "Einstein is dead. Schopenhauer is dead... and I'm not feeling so well myself!"

He was the king of dark humor. He performed as a wacko. Truthfully, he was always depressed in real life and people thought it was his stage character.  He was from a rich family in Europe and then his whole family went to concentration camps and lost it all. When he came to the States, he quickly became a huge celebrity in the Village. Then he totally disappeared and became a has been. Dick remembered him and tracked him down. We asked him to perform at the Townhouse and he turned us down saying that his life was over and he couldn't perform anymore. We insisted that he try to perform again in our place. He didn't make it easy for us. He had all these provisions that he tried to use on us to not perform.

He ended up doing the Saturday night midnight show for three years. We revived his career and it helped promote us. We did Equity Showcase Theater for out of work actors to display their talents. We had famous directors trying out their shows. One time an audition for a two-person show brought in 2000 actors vying for the parts. The line went all around the block.

Theodore made 16 appearances on NBC's Late Night with David Letterman in the 1980s; Letterman introduced him as “a noted philosopher, metaphysician, and podiatrist”. In the early 1980s, he was a regular on the Billy Crystal Comedy Hour. He also did voice work, including the voice-over to the American trailer for Lucio Fulci's The House by the Cemetery in 1981. In 1989 he appeared in the Joe Dante comedy film The 'Burbs. Up until the late 1990s, he was a guest actor in several episodes of Joe Frank: Work in Progress radio show on National Public Radio (NPR). Beginning in 1982, Theodore took up residence on Saturday nights for a nearly two-decade run at the 13th Street Repertory Theatre in Greenwich Village.

An article on Theodore appeared in RAVE magazine with color photos. Segments from it are in the book Who's Who in Comedy. Just prior to his death from pneumonia, he recorded several monologues for the controversial documentary series, Disinfo Nation. He appeared in Billy Crystal's mockumentary Don't Get Me Started and voiced the character of an ointment expert on NPR's Weekend Edition Saturday version of Julius Knipl, Real Estate Photographer in 1995.

To My Great Chagrin documentary
In early 2001, Theodore requested to meet with film artist Jeff Sumerel about producing a documentary about Theodore. After an in-person meeting, Sumerel received Theodore's approval, and they agreed to proceed with the film.

Theodore was cautious. Past attempts at a documentary had been aborted out of his eventual suspicions and distrust of the filmmakers. Sumerel had heard of Theodore's self-sabotage tendencies. In February, preliminary shooting began, with informal interviews with Theodore in his apartment; in April, Theodore became ill with pneumonia and died.

Sumerel was still encouraged by Theodore's family and friends to continue with the documentary. As no funding was available, Sumerel continued the project as a labor of love as time and financing allowed. It was his interview with Henry Gibson that began to lead to other notable performers who were devotees. Gibson connected Sumerel with Penn & Teller (friends of Gibson's) who were long-time, avid Theodorians. Over the next 5 years Sumerel was able to capture interviews with Dick Cavett, Eric Bogosian, Tom Schiller, Harlan Ellison, Len Belzer, Joe Dante, Mark Shulman, and Woody Allen, among others. Sumerel spent the next two years gathering archival materials and working with editor Jeter Rhodes, to sift through the vast amount of content conveying Theodore's personal and professional life.The result was a non-traditional documentary titled To My Great Chagrin: The Unbelievable Story of Brother Theodore. The film was selected for premiere, February 13, 2008, at the opening night of the Museum of Modern Art's Fortnight Series.

Death
Theodore died in New York City on April 5, 2001, at the age of 94. He is buried in Mount Pleasant Cemetery in Hawthorne, New York.

His headstone reads: Known as Brother Theodore / Solo Performer, Comedian, Metaphysician / "As Long as There Is Death, There Is Hope"

Media presence

Discography
 Entertainment of Sinister and Disconcerting Humor (Tears from a Glass Eye, With a Tongue of Madness): (10 in. disc, Proscenium 21)
 Coral Records Presents Theodore: (Coral S 7322)
 To My Great Chagrin

Film appearances
 The Stranger (1946)
 So Dark the Night (1946)
 The Lone Wolf in Mexico (1947)
 The Black Widow (serial) (1947)
 The Third Man (1949)
 A Nose (1966) (based on the Nikolai Gogol short story "The Nose")
 Horror of the Blood Monsters (1970) (narration)
 Massage Parlor Murders! (1973)
 Gums (1976)
 Devil's Express (1976)
 The Hobbit (1977) (animated TV movie; voice of Gollum)
 Nocturna: Granddaughter of Dracula (1979)
 The Return of the King (1980) (animated TV movie; voice of Gollum)
 The Last Unicorn (1982) (animated film; voice of Rukh)
 The Invisible Kid (1988)
 That's Adequate (1989)
 The 'Burbs (1989)

Note
Theodore claimed on one of his David Letterman appearances that he had filmed a scene as a supermarket cashier in Leonard Part 6 starring Bill Cosby, but was fired after a day of shooting because he repeatedly mocked the star.

Television appearances
 The Joey Bishop Show: 10/31/1967, 11/8/1967 
 The Merv Griffin Show: 1966
 The Tomorrow Show with Tom Snyder: 10/31/1977
 Billy Crystal: Don't Get Me Started – The Billy Crystal Special: 1986
 Billy Crystal: Don't Get Me Started – The Lost Minutes: 1987
 Late Night with David Letterman (NBC): 9/10/1982, 10/20/1982, 2/3/1983, 5/19/1983, 7/8/1983, 9/7/1983, 2/21/1984, 5/16/1984, 9/17/1984, 12/19/1984, 7/8/1985, 10/31/1985, 9/17/1986, 7/24/1987, 1/13/1988, 2/17/1989 (collected on YouTube)
Beyond Vaudeville: 8/19/89

Radio appearances
 Joe Frank's radio shows The Decline of Spengler, The End, A Tour of the City, Black Light
 Steve Post The Outside radio show on WBAI in New York during the 1960s and 70s.
 Bob Claster's Funny Stuff on KCRW in Santa Monica, September 24, 1989.
 The Ointment Expert: Julius Knipl, Real Estate Photographer, 1996 //www.hearingvoices.com/webwork/isay/knipl.html

References

Further reading

External links

Brother Theodore interview with Geo. Stewart

1906 births
2001 deaths
American male comedians
20th-century American comedians
American male film actors
Jewish emigrants from Nazi Germany to the United States
Performance art in New York City
Jewish American male actors
Dachau concentration camp survivors
University of Cologne alumni
Jewish American comedians
20th-century American male actors
20th-century American Jews